Koji Ishikawa may refer to:
Kōji Ishikawa (illustrator) (born 1963), Japanese children's book author and illustrator
Koji Ishikawa (artist) (born 1968), Japanese artist, based in the U.S.
Ishikawa Kouji (Super Health Club Character); also known as Ishihawa Kouji and Ko. (Pronounced as Ishikawa Kouji in-game)